Claire Davinroy (née Valy; 14 October 1897 – 15 February 1973) was one of the first women to sit in the French Parliament. She was a member of the Provisional Consultative Assembly between 1944 and 1945.

See also 

 Women in the French Senate

References 

1897 births
1973 deaths
20th-century French politicians
Members of the Provisional Consultative Assembly
French Resistance members
Female resistance members of World War II
Ravensbrück concentration camp survivors
People from Paris
20th-century French women politicians
Women members of the Senate (France)